Rock Beach (or, known as, "Pondicherry Beach". French: Plage de la promenade)  is the popular stretch of beachfront in the city of Puducherry, India, along the Bay of Bengal. It is a 1.2-kilometre-long stretch in Pondicherry, starts from War Memorial and end at Dupleix Park on the Goubert Avenue.

Other attractions
 War Memorial
 Chief Secretariat
 The Promenade
 Le Café
 Mahatma Gandhi statue
 Dupleix Park

Panoramas

Gallery

See also
Puducherry
Pondicherry (city)
Tourism in Puducherry

References

Beaches of Puducherry
Tourist attractions in Puducherry
Pondicherry (city)